The 2019–20 Football Championship of Vinnytsia Oblast was won by FC Tomashpil.

First League table

References

Football championship
Vinnytsia